The Roman Catholic Diocese of Ketapang is a diocese located in the city of Ketapang in the Ecclesiastical province of Pontianak in Indonesia.

History
 14 June 1954: Established as the Apostolic Prefecture of Ketapang from the Apostolic Vicariate of Pontianak
 3 January 1961: Promoted as Diocese of Ketapang

Leadership
 Bishops of Ketapang (Roman rite)
 Bishop Pius Riana Prapdi (9 September 2012 – present)
 Bishop Blasius Pujoraharja (15 March 1979 – 25 June 2012)
 Bishop Gabriel W. Sillekens, C.P. (3 January 1961 – 15 March 1979)
 Prefects Apostolic of Ketapang (Roman Rite) 
 Fr. Gabriel W. Sillekens, C.P. (later Bishop) (25 August 1954 – 3 January 1961)

References
 GCatholic.org
 Catholic Hierarchy

Ketapang
Roman Catholic dioceses in Indonesia
Christian organizations established in 1954
Roman Catholic dioceses and prelatures established in the 20th century